Behind the Mourner's Veil is an EP by death metal band Deceased, released in 2001 on Relapse Records. It was their last release on the label.

Track listing
"It's Alive" - 4:08	
"The Mausoleum" - 4:58	
"Zombie Attack" (Tankard cover) - 3:04	
"Reaganomics" (D.R.I. cover) - 0:36
"New Age of Total Warfare" (Warfare cover) - 2:16	
"Deathrider" (Anthrax cover) - 2:56	
"Victims of the Masterplan" - 10:01

Originally, the record was going to include another original song, "Slow Infection", based on the Black Dahlia murder, and a cover of the Hallows Eve song "Plunging to Megadeath". The former was not included on the final cut, and the latter was replaced by a cover of Warfare's "New Age of Total Warfare".

Songs
 "It's Alive!" is based on the 70s movie 'It's Alive!'
 "Victims of the Masterplan" is about the West Memphis Three and is split into five parts:
I. The Child Murders
II. Confession And Fear
III. Speculation
IV. The Masterplan
V. Forever We Must Wonder

Personnel
 King Fowley - drums, vocals
 Mark Adams - guitar
 Mike Smith - guitar
 Les Snyder - bass

Production
Mike Bossier - engineer
Allen Koszowski - cover art
Mike Fisher - cover art

References

External links

Behind the Mourner's Veil at Relapse Records
Behind the Mourner's Veil at the Encyclopaedia Metallum

Deceased (band) EPs
2001 EPs